The middle frontal gyrus makes up about one-third of the frontal lobe of the human brain.  (A gyrus is one of the prominent "bumps" or "ridges" on the surface of the human brain.)

The middle frontal gyrus, like the inferior frontal gyrus and the superior frontal gyrus, is more of a region in the frontal gyrus than a true gyrus. 

The borders of the middle frontal gyrus are the inferior frontal sulcus below; the superior frontal sulcus above; and the precentral sulcus behind.

Additional images

References

Gyri
Frontal lobe